Nick Cunningham (born May 8, 1985) is an American bobsledder who has competed since 2008. Nick Cunningham is a Sergeant in the New York Army National Guard in the 1156 Engineering Company, Vertical, and his job is a Construction and Masonry Engineer. Cunningham graduated from Monterey Peninsula College in 2005 and Boise State University in 2008 with a degree in Communications.  While at BSU he was an elected team captain for the track team. Cunningham also holds a master's degree in Athletic Coaching Education from Ohio University. When he is not bobsledding, Cunningham enjoys football, track, surfing, and rodeo.  His favorite sliding memory is accepting his first gold medal and standing on top of the podium with the National Anthem being played. Cunningham made the official switch from the back of the sled to the driver's seat in 2010 and has been consistent National Team driver for the U.S. program.  Coaches expect Cunningham to be vying for a spot on the 2018 Winter Olympic Team.

Cunningham began bobsled in 2008 and was immediately selected as an alternate for World Cup team.  In addition, Cunningham helped push driver Mike Kohn to two gold medals on the America's Cup tour and a silver and a bronze medal at the 2009 National Championships.  During 2009 World Championships, Cunningham helped push driver John Napier to an 11th-place finish.

Olympic highlights 

2010 Olympic Winter Games
Placed 12th in the two-man event with a time of 3:29.78
Placed 13th in the four-man event

2014 Olympic Winter Games
Placed 13th in the two-man event 
Placed 12th in the four-man event

2018 Olympic Winter Games
Placed 21st in the two-man event
Placed 19th in the four-man event

Career highlights 

2011–2012 World Cup in two-man
-9th in Whistler (2/12)
2011–2012 World Cup in four-man
-9th in Whistler (2/12)
2011–2012 America's Cup in two-man
– SILVER in Park City #1 (11/11), SILVER in Park City #2 (11/11), SILVER in Calgary #1 (11/11), SILVER in Calgary #2 (11/11), GOLD in Lake Placid #1 (12/11), GOLD in Lake Placid #2 (12/11)
2011–2012 America's Cup in four-man
-SILVER in Park City #1 (11/11), SILVER in Park City #2 (11/11), GOLD in Calgary #1 (11/11), BRONZE in Calgary #2 (11/11), SILVER in Lake Placid #1 (12/11), 6th in Lake Placid #2 (12/11)

2010–2011 America's Cup in two-man
-7th in Park City #1 (11/10), 7th in Park City #2 (11/10), SILVER in Calgary #1 (11/10), BRONZE in Lake Placid #1 (1/11), SILVER in Lake Placid #2 (1/11), 10th in Calgary #2 (1/11), 10th in Calgary #3 (1/11)
2010–2011 America's Cup in four-man
-BRONZE in Lake Placid #1 (1/11), BRONZE in Lake Placid #2 (1/11), 9th in Calgary #2 (1/11), 7th in Calgary #3 (1/11)

2009–2010 World Cup as brakeman for Mike Kohn & John Napier in the four-man
-14th in Lake Placid (11/09), 9th in Cesana (12/09), 22nd in Konigssee (1/10), 6th in St. Mortiz (1/10), 17th in igls (1/10)
2009–2010 World Cup as brakeman for Mike Kohn in the two-man
-9th in Lake Placid (11/09),
2009–2010 America's Cup as brakeman for Mike Kohn in the four-man
-GOLD in Lake Placid #1 (12/09), GOLD in Lake Placid #2 (12/09)
2009–2010 America's Cup as brakeman for Mike Kohn in the two-man
-GOLD in Lake Placid #2 (12/09), GOLD in Lake Placid #3 (12/09)
12th at 2009 U.S. National Bobsled Push Championship
11th at 2009 World Championships in four-man
2008–09 America's Cup as a push athlete for Mike Kohn in four-man
-GOLD in Calgary #1 (11/08), GOLD in Calgary #2 (11/08), 2nd in Park City #1 (11/08), BRONZE in Park City #2 (11/08) -BRONZE at 2009 National Championships
SILVER at 2009 National Championship in two-man
2008–2009 World Cup Alternate for Steven Holcomb

References

External links 

 
 
 
 US Bobsleigh and Skeleton Federation announcement of the US Olympic men's bobsleigh team. January 17, 2010. Accessed January 18, 2010.
  

1985 births
Living people
American male bobsledders
Bobsledders at the 2010 Winter Olympics
Bobsledders at the 2014 Winter Olympics
Olympic bobsledders of the United States
Monterey Peninsula Lobos football players
Boise State University alumni
College men's track and field athletes in the United States
Bobsledders at the 2018 Winter Olympics
United States Army soldiers
New York National Guard personnel
U.S. Army World Class Athlete Program